Intercités (IC), known before September 2009 as Corail Intercités, is a brand name used by France's national railway company, the SNCF, to denote non high-speed services on the classic rail network in France. 

The SNCF established the Intercités brand in January 2006 to capture the remaining, mainly medium distance network of Corail trains, so called because they use the air-conditioned fleet of Corail coaches introduced by the SNCF from 1975. Intercités covers all the important SNCF routes not served by the TGV network.

Since December 2011, the former Téoz (long distance trains with obligatory reservation) and Intercités de nuit (overnight sleeper train) brands have been re-integrated and the Intercités brand now covers all non high-speed SNCF national network passenger services. In October 2012, the new Socialist French Government announced increased funding for Intercités services, as part of a new transport strategy.

Network

The Intercités network consists of the following lines as of January 2022:

Day trains

Night trains

As of January 2022, the Intercités de Nuit network consists of the following lines:
Paris - Gap - Briançon
Paris - Marseille - Nice
Paris - Rodez - Albi
Paris - Pamiers - Latour-de-Carol
Paris - Narbonne - Portbou
Paris - Tarbes - Hendaye
Paris - Toulouse

References

External links
Official website (in French)

SNCF brands
Train-related introductions in 2006